Fernando Wong is a Panamanian landscape designer born in Panama City. He moved to the United States in 2001 and established his landscape architecture firm, Fernando Wong Outdoor Living Design, Inc. in Miami Beach, Florida in 2005. Since then he has opened additional offices in Palm Beach, Florida and Southampton, New York. Wong designs large private gardens, public parks, museums and hotels (including three Four Seasons Hotels and Resorts), and has won several design awards. His television show Clipped with Martha Stewart debuted on the Discovery+ and HGTV channels on March 12, 2021. Wong has been called "one of the most important landscape designers in America" by Architectural Digest.

Early life 
Fernando Wong grew up in Panama City, Panama. He is the grandson of a Chinese immigrant. He trained in architecture, and graduated with a degree in interior design from the University of Panama. Wong's father encouraged him to be an athlete, so he competed as a swimmer and pentathlete from the ages of 19 to 24. Wong learned to speak English by watching American television shows. When he first moved to the United States he earned a living by doing renderings for interior designers  and working on a landscape crew. The owner of the landscape company saw Wong's drawings, took him off the crew, and sent him to the office to work on designs.

Career 

Wong established his company Fernando Wong Outdoor Living Design, Inc with his partner Tim Johnson in 2005.
When his roster of clients grew in Palm Beach, North Palm Beach, Florida and in Jupiter, Florida, Wong opened up a second office in Palm Beach, where his work has included creating landscaping for contemporary as well as historic homes.   In 2017 the company opened a third office in Southampton, New York.

Wong's designs include a 15,000-square-foot sculpture garden at the Institute of Contemporary Art (Miami),
3 Four Seasons Hotels and Resorts in South Florida, the Four Seasons Private Residences in Fort Lauderdale, 
a Starwood Luxury Collection Hotel called the Perry Lane in Savannah, Georgia, and a National Park in Nassau, Bahamas for the Bahamian government.

Wong designed the landscape and outdoor space at The Surf Club at the Four Seasons (Miami Beach) with Pritzker Architecture Prize winning architect Richard Meier. Wong also worked in collaboration with Paris-based architect/interior designer Joseph Dirand, Miami architect Kobi Karp and New York interior designer Lee Mindell. He went on to design the outdoor spaces for the Four Seasons Private Residences in Fort Lauderdale with London-based interior designers Martin Brudnizki and Tara Bernard.

In 2019 Wong was the honorary co-chair of the Chicago Antiques + Art + Design Show, along with award-winning interior designer Amanda Lindroth.

Because Wong was trained in architecture, he uses classical architectural principles in his garden designs, like scale, balance, harmony and symmetry. His designs are also influenced by his studies in interior design  and strategic use of lighting. Wong has also branched out into indoor design ideas.

Publicity
In 2020 Discovery, Inc. announced that Wong would be part of the launch of its new subscription cable channel Discovery+ by starring with Martha Stewart and Chris Lambton in a show called Clipped. The show premiered on Discovery+ and HGTV on May 12, 2021.

In 2021 Wong was named to the Luxe Interior + Design magazine's Gold List. In February of that same year, he was chosen as one of the designers for the prestigious decorator show house, Kips Bay Palm Beach.

Awards

Other 
Fernando Wong is a member of the Institute of Classical Architecture & Art. In 2019 Wong was appointed to the Palm Beach Landmarks Preservation Commission by the Palm Beach Town Council.

References 

Living people
People from Panama City
21st-century Panamanian people
20th-century Panamanian people
Panamanian expatriates in the United States
People from Miami Beach, Florida
University of Panama alumni
Gay artists
Panamanian LGBT people
Panamanian people of Chinese descent
Year of birth missing (living people)
American landscape and garden designers
New Classical architecture
People from Palm Beach, Florida
American LGBT businesspeople